Whiteshells (also known as Cowrie shells or Sacred Miigis Shells) were used by aboriginal peoples around the world, but the words "whiteshell" and "Miigis Shell" specifically refers to shells used by Ojibway peoples in their Midewiwin ceremonies.  Whiteshell Provincial Park in Manitoba, Canada is named after the use of these shells.

See also
Wampum
"miigis" at Wiktionary

References

American Indian relics
Anishinaabe culture